Paschal Donohoe (born 19 September 1974) is an Irish Fine Gael politician who has served as Minister for Public Expenditure, National Development Plan Delivery and Reform since December 2022 and President of the Eurogroup since July 2020. He has been a Teachta Dála (TD) for the Dublin Central constituency since 2011. He served as Minister for Finance of Ireland from 2017 to 2022, Minister for Public Expenditure and Reform from 2016 to 2020, Minister for Transport, Tourism and Sport from 2014 to 2016 and Minister of State for European Affairs from 2013 to 2014.

Early life
Donohoe was born in Phibsborough, Dublin, in 1974 and grew up in Blanchardstown. He is the son of a Stena Line employee who also worked renting marquees and tents. He was educated at St. Declan's CBS in Cabra, before receiving a scholarship to Trinity College Dublin. He studied Politics and Economics as part of the Business, Economics and Social Science programme and graduated with a first-class honours degree in 1996. He served as Secretary of the University Philosophical Society, a debating and paper-reading society.

From Trinity College, Donohoe was selected by the multinational company Procter & Gamble in the UK, for their fast-track graduate training programme. He spent six years working in the United Kingdom and became a sales and marketing director. In 2003, he returned to Ireland to pursue a career in politics.

Political career
Donohoe was first elected to Dublin City Council in 2004, for the Cabra-Glasnevin local electoral area. During this time he was Chairperson of the Central Area Committee, Chairperson of the Environmental Strategic Policy Committee and a member of the City Corporate Policy Committee.

He was an unsuccessful candidate at the 2007 general election in the Dublin Central constituency, but was elected to Seanad Éireann as a Senator for the Administrative Panel in July 2007. He was appointed in October 2007, as Fine Gael Seanad Spokesperson on Transport and the Marine. He was a member of the Joint Oireachtas committee on Transport and the Joint Oireachtas committee on European Affairs.

He was appointed Chairman of the Joint Oireachtas Committee on Ireland's Future in Europe, by Enda Kenny, in October 2008. On 24 March 2009, he was nominated by Fine Gael to run in the Dublin Central by-election, caused by the death of Tony Gregory, but he was unsuccessful in this election. He topped the poll at the 2011 general election and was elected on the 2nd count.

In government

Minister of State for European Affairs (2013–2014)
Following the resignation of Lucinda Creighton, who had broken the government whip in a vote on the Protection of Life During Pregnancy Bill, Donohoe was appointed as Minister of State for European Affairs on 12 July 2013.

Minister for Transport, Tourism and Sport (2014–2016)
On 11 July 2014, Donohoe was promoted to the cabinet, as Minister for Transport, Tourism and Sport, a position he held until 6 May 2016.

During his tenure he oversaw the sale of the Government's remaining 25% stake in Aer Lingus, to the International Airlines Group, however, he was also confronted with a series of strikes by Dublin Bus, Luas and Irish Rail workers.

Minister for Public Expenditure and Reform (2016–2020)
Donohoe was appointed Minister for Public Expenditure and Reform, following the formation of a Fine Gael minority government in May 2016.

In the weeks leading up to his first budget in October 2016, Donohoe took over most of the workload from Minister for Finance Michael Noonan, who had been hospitalised for a period. Hopes of a budget splurge were quashed after Donohoe signalled Brexit and other world events would have "seismic consequences" on Ireland. On budget day he announced €58 billion in various day-to-day and capital expenditure which was an increase in €4 billion from the previous budget.

During his tenure as Minister for Public Expenditure and Reform, Donohoe dealt with a number of complex issues, including a threatened strike by the Garda Síochána. This resulted in a recommendation by the Labour Court and  the decision not to proceed with industrial action by members of AGSI and the GRA.

Donohoe also negotiated a new national pay agreement for public servants, known as the Public Service Stability Agreement 2018–2020. This outlined a roadmap for the full and complete unwinding of the emergency legislation introduced during the financial crisis (FEMPI - Financial Emergency Measures in the Public Interest) as it affects, among other things, the remuneration of public servants and the pensions in payment of retired public servants.

Donohoe also formed part of the Government's negotiating team following the 2016 general election. This resulted in the formation of a minority Fine Gael government with Independents, underpinned by a confidence and supply agreement with the main opposition party Fianna Fáil.

His period as Minister for Public Expenditure and Reform ended on 27 June 2020, following the formation of the 32nd Government led by Micheál Martin. He was succeeded by Michael McGrath.

Minister for Finance (2017–2022)
Following the appointment of Leo Varadkar as Taoiseach, Donohoe was appointed as Minister for Finance, taking office on 14 June 2017. On 10 October 2017, Donohoe presented his first budget as Minister for Finance.

Donohoe presided over the public finance during a time when a budget surplus was recorded (in 2018) for the first time since the financial crisis (2006), marking a significant achievement for the Government.

Working with Cabinet colleagues, he engineered a new €116bn, 10-year National Development Plan which underpins Project Ireland 2040; a plan aimed at preparing for an Ireland in which an extra one million people will live and which will have 660,000 more people at work. This also feeds into the Government's bid to increase Ireland's annual capital expenditure in line with EU norms. Budget 2019 saw an increase in capital expenditure by 25%, going from €5.7bn in 2018 to €7.2bn in 2019.

In both of his budgets as Minister for Finance, Donohoe made decisions to increase taxes in order to allow for increased spending. In Budget 2018, this was done by way of a tripling of the stamp duty rate on the sale of commercial property. The following year he reverted to the standard rate of VAT for the hospitality and services sector (going from 9% back up to 13.5%); a measure which had been introduced during the financial crisis in a bid to aid those sectors.

In 2018, Donohoe and Michael D'Arcy welcomed Ireland's issuing of its first green bond, making Ireland one of the first countries in the world to do so. That year he also published Ireland's Roadmap on Corporation Tax (CT) taking stock of the changing international tax environment, outlining the actions Ireland has taken to date in the area of CT and the further actions to be taken over the coming years.

Donohoe is an opponent of the European Commission's Digital Services Tax, instead favouring a more globalised approach to the matter through the work of the OECD. He is a staunch defender of Ireland 12.5% corporation tax, which he repeatedly says will neither go up nor down under his Government's tenure, offering security to businesses in that regard. Donohoe attended the Davos World Economic Forum in 2018 and 2019. He has also attended the Bilderberg Meetings.

Following the appointment of Micheál Martin as Taoiseach, Donohoe was appointed for a second term as Minister for Finance on 27 June 2020.

Minister for Public Expenditure, National Development Plan Delivery and Reform (2022–present)
On 17 December 2022, after Leo Varadkar succeeded as Taoiseach in a rotation agreement with Micheál Martin, Donohoe was appointed as Minister for Public Expenditure, National Development Plan Delivery and Reform, while Michael McGrath was appointed as Minister for Finance.

In January 2023, the Phoenix Magazine and the Irish Examiner revealed that Donohoe failed to properly declare a donation of services from a company in 2016. The Standards in Public Office Commission (SIPO) made a complaint against Donohoe that the Designer Group engineering firm used two company vans and six employees to erect and later remove election posters for Donohoe in his Dublin Central constituency during the 2016 general election campaign. On 14 January, Donohoe began conducting a review of his election expenses statements amid the allegations which he had denied. The next day, on 15 January, he apologised for making incorrect declarations of election expenses and donations during his campaign and said he would recuse himself from any decision making around ethics legislation while the SIPO investigated him, but refused to resign as minister. The controversy intensified on 20 January when Donohoe identified a new issue over expenses from the 2020 general election.

President of the Eurogroup
On 9 July 2020, Donohoe was elected as President of the Eurogroup, succeeding Mário Centeno, taking office on 13 July 2020. Donohoe is considered to have performed well as President of the Eurogroup by his European peers.

Donohue's term as President was initially due to expire in January 2023. However, under the coalition agreement reached by Fianna Fáil, Fine Gael and the Green Party, Micheál Martin was due to resign as Taoiseach and be replaced by Leo Varadkar in December 2022, with Martin becoming Tánaiste in place of Varadkar. As part of this change of Taoiseach, a wider cabinet reshuffle was expected, with Michael McGrath of Fianna Fáil expected to become Minister for Finance in place of Donohue, and Donohue assuming McGrath's role as Minister for Public Expenditure and Reform. This would mean that McGrath, as Minister for Finance, would attend Eurogroup meetings on behalf of Ireland instead of Donohue. Despite this, the Irish Government announced in November 2022 its intention to nominate Donohoe for a second term as President of the Eurogroup, which, if such Donohoe was re-elected as President, would result in two Irish ministers attending Eurogroup meetings; Donohoe would attend as President of the Eurogroup (despite no longer being the national finance minister) and McGrath would attend on behalf of Ireland as Minister for Finance.

On 5 December 2022, Donohoe was re-elected as President of the Eurogroup, beginning his second term on 13 January 2023.

Personal life
Donohoe married British-born Justine Davey in 2001. They have two children, a son and a daughter, and live in Phibsborough.

Other
Donohoe regularly writes book reviews for The Irish Times, as well as for other publications.

References

External links

Paschal Donohoe's page on the Fine Gael website

 

|-

|-

|-

|-

|-

|-

1974 births
Alumni of Trinity College Dublin
Fine Gael senators
Fine Gael TDs
Living people
Local councillors in Dublin (city)
Members of the 23rd Seanad
Members of the 31st Dáil
Members of the 32nd Dáil
Members of the 33rd Dáil
Ministers for Finance (Ireland)
Ministers for Transport (Ireland)
Ministers of State of the 31st Dáil
Politicians from Dublin (city)
Procter & Gamble people
Ministers for Public Expenditure, National Development Plan Delivery and Reform
People educated at St. Declan's College, Dublin